Maria Fernanda Cuartas (born September 8, 1967, in Bogotá) is a Colombian painter. Cuartas was born in Bogotá and grew up in Cali, Colombia. In 2007 and again in 2010 she was listed by the Biblioteca de Artistas de las Comunidades Europeas (BACE - The Artists Library of the European Union) as one of the 100 "most important contemporary artists in the world."

Artwork 
Her subject matter is centered on problems in society, gender equality, and the dignity of women. Her paintings are characterized by faceless people, most often women. Her style is neo-figurative. Her work has been exhibited in the United States, Colombia, Argentina, Italy, Spain, Dubai, and Mexico.

Awards 
The Colombian House of Representatives decorated her with the Orden de la Democracia Simón Bolívar, a civil honor, for her art.  In 2020 she was commissioned to create a public sculpture for the Alfonso Bonilla Aragón International Airport to "highlight female values." The sculpture, titled "Ella" (She) has subsequently received a variety of critical responses, including highly negative critical reactions to the message that it conveys.

References

 
1967 births
Living people
21st-century women artists
Colombian painters
Colombian women painters
People from Bogotá
People from Cali